The 1974–75 season was the 60th in the history of the Isthmian League, an English football competition.

Wycombe Wanderers won Division One, while Staines Town won Division Two.

Division One

Division One featured 22 clubs, including 20 clubs from the previous season and two clubs, promoted from Division Two:
Dagenham
Slough Town

League table

Division Two

Division Two expanded up to 18 clubs, including fourteen clubs from the previous season and four new clubs:
Two clubs relegated from Division One:
Corinthian-Casuals
St Albans City

Two clubs switched from the Athenian League:
Boreham Wood
Croydon

League table

References

Isthmian League seasons
I